Suwanee or Suwannee may refer to:

 Suwanee, Georgia
 Suwanee, Kentucky
 USS Suwanee
 Suwanee point, a Paleo-Indian projectile point
 Suwannee Canal, alternatively spelled Suwanee Canel
 Suwannee River, Suwanee being an alternative spelling of the Suwannee River
 Suwanee River Route

See also
 Suwannee (disambiguation)
 Sewanee (disambiguation)
 Swanee (disambiguation)